Emine Sabancı Kamışlı (born 1966) is a Turkish businesswoman and a third-generation member of the Sabancı family.

Early years
She was born in Adana, Turkey as the second child of billionaire and philanthropist Şevket Sabancı (1936–2021). Between 1984 and 1987, she studied economics at London School of Economics and Political Science in london, United Kingdom. She then worked in Willis Towers Watson for two years as an analyst.

Career
Upon her return to Turkey she started working at her family's insurance company Aksigorta, and eventually became the CEO of the firm. She also served on the board of her family's conglomerate Sabancı Holding. In 2001, Kamışlı quit her roles at the Sabancı Holding, and joined the newly established family office of her father's company Esas Holding. Today, she is responsible for the wealth management arm of Esas Holding and acts as the head of the family office.

References

External links
 Esas Holding

1969 births
Living people
Businesspeople from Adana
Ali Sabanci
Tufts University alumni
Columbia Business School alumni